Hori Bakusui 堀麦水 (1718-1783) was a major Japanese poet of the Matsuo Bashō revival, writing traditional style haiku poems.

Biography

Little is known of Bakusui's life apart from his poems. He came from Kanazawa in the middle Edo period, and studied under Otsuyu. He is considered romantic by temperament, and he attempted to revive the early style of the classical Haiku poet of the previous century, Matsuo Bashō, from the book Minashiguri. in 1770 he wrote a book of laconic comments on Bashō's hokku, called Jōkyō shōfū kukai densho (Orthodox style of the Jōkyō era: Verses with critical commentary).

Haiku

One of Bakusui's poems, on the popular haiku theme of the dragonfly, runs:

Another version on the same subject is

See also
 Haikai

References

1718 births
1783 deaths
18th-century Japanese poets
Japanese haiku poets